The Mitsubishi R39B is a , four-stroke, DOHC, naturally-aspirated, four-cylinder racing engine, designed, developed, and built by Mitsubishi, for the Japanese Formula 2000 championship, in 1971. It is itself based on the Saturn engine.

Applications
Mitsubishi Colt F2000
Lola T290

References

R39B
Straight-four engines